The Flag Officer, Flying Training, later called Flag Officer Naval Flying Training, was a senior Royal Navy appointment responsible for all naval aviation flying training from 1945 to 1970.

History
Vice-Admiral Lumley Lyster held the post of Flag Officer Carrier Training and Administration from its establishment on April 27, 1943, to September 1945. In September 1945, Vice-Admiral Lyster hauled down his flag and his post was abolished. Instead three separate admirals' posts supervising different areas of naval aviation training were created. One of them was the appointment of Flag Officer, Flying Training. The post was abolished in 1970.

The officer holder reported to the Flag Officer, Air (Home) from 1945 to 1964 then the Flag Officer Naval Air Command from 1964 to 1970.

Flag Officer's, Flying Training
Post holders included:
 Rear-Admiral Lachlan D. Mackintosh: September 1945 – September 1947 
 Rear-Admiral Charles E. Lambe:  September 1947 – August 1949
 Rear-Admiral Edmund W. Anstice: August 1949 – August 1951
 Rear-Admiral Walter T. Couchman: August 1951 – June 1953
 Rear-Admiral Guy Willoughby: June 1953 – February 1956
 Rear-Admiral Charles L.G. Evans: February 1956 – October 1957
 Rear-Admiral Dennis R.F. Cambell: October 1957 – September 1960 
 Rear-Admiral Frank H.E. Hopkins: September 1960 – October 1961 
 Rear-Admiral Philip D. Gick: October 1961 – July 1964

Flag Officer Naval Flying Training
 Rear-Admiral Donald C.E.F. Gibson:   July 1964 – October 1965 
 Rear-Admiral David W. Kirke: October 1965 – February 1968
 Rear-Admiral Cedric K. Roberts: February 1968 – November 1970

References

F